The 2008–09 Cypriot First Division was the seventy season of top-tier football on Cyprus. It started on 30 August 2008 and ended on 10 May 2009. The defending champions were Anorthosis.

APOEL won the championship three matchweeks before the end of the season.

This year, for the second time, the championship also featured a group stage play-off system. Teams were divided into 3 groups: 1st–4th, 5th–8th and 9th–12th. Points from the main part of the season still counted.

Format
Fourteen teams participated in the 2008–09 Cypriot First Division. Each team played against every other team twice, once at home and once away, for a total of 26 matches. After these matches, the two teams with the worst records were relegated to the 2009–10 Cypriot Second Division. The remaining twelve teams were divided into three groups: 1st-4th, 5th-8th and 9th-12th. 

The teams ranked first through fourth played out the champion and the participants for the European competitions. Teams ranked ninth through 12th determined the third relegated club, while the remaining four teams played a placement round. Every team played twice against its group opponents. Regular season records are carried over without any modifications.

The champions ensured their participation in the 2009–10 UEFA Champions League and the runners-up and the third team in the 2009–10 UEFA Europa League.

Point system
Teams received three points for a win, one point for a draw and zero points for a loss.

Stadia and locations

Promotion and relegation
Teams promoted from 2007-08 Cypriot Second Division:
 Champions: AE Paphos
 Runners-up: APEP
 3rd placed team: Atromitos

Teams relegated to 2008–09 Cypriot Second Division :
 Aris Limassol
 Nea Salamina
 Olympiakos Nicosia

Overview

Managerial changes

First round

League table

Results

Second round

Group A

Table

Results

Group B

Table

Results

Group C

Table

Results

Top goalscorers
Source: soccerway.com (First round, Second round)

Season statistics

Scoring
First goal of the season: Peter Ofori-Quaye for AEL against Apollon, 2nd minute (30 August 2008)
Fastest goal in a match: 47 seconds – Demetris Christofi for Omonia against Alki (29 December 2008) 
Goal scored at the latest point in a match: 90+3 minutes
Klodian Duro for Omonia against APOP (14 December 2008)
Chrysis Michael for APOEL against AEL (22 March 2009)
Goal scored at the latest point in a match: 90+2 minutes
Francisco Aguirre for Omonia against Atromitos (27 September 2008)
Nikolaos Frousos for Anorthosis against APOP (31 October 2008)
Tinga for AEP against Alki (21 December 2008)
Widest winning margin: 
6 goals – Omonia 7–1 Enosis (22 December 2008)
6 goals – Apollon 7–1 Alki (25 January 2009)
Most goals in a match: 9 goals – Atromitos 3–6 Apollon (8 February 2009)
Most goals in one half: 5 goals – APOEL 3–2 Doxa (31 August 2008)
First own goal of the season: Mahamadou Sidibè (Ethnikos) for AEL, 50 minutes (2 November 2008)
First hat-trick of the season: Ioannis Okkas (Omonia) against AEK (6 December 2008)
Fastest hat trick of the season: 14 minutes – Klodian Duro (Omonia) against APOP (14 December 2008)

Discipline
First yellow card of the season: Levan Maghradze for Apollon against AEL, 11th minute (30 August 2008)
First red card of the season: Levan Maghradze for Apollon against AEL, 78th minute (30 August 2008)
Most yellow cards in a single match: 9 – Apollon 1–3 AEL – 4 for Apollon (Levan Maghradze (2), Christos Marangos & Gastón Sangoy) and 5 for AEL (Panos Constantinou, Dušan Kerkez, Peter Ofori-Quaye, Laurent Fassotte & Silvio Augusto González) (30 August 2008)
Most red cards in a single match: 3 – AEP 2–3 Omonia – 2 for AEP (Almir Tanjič & Jefisley André Caldeira) and 1 for Omonia (Aleksandar Pantić)
Card given at latest point in a game: Aleksandar Pantić (red) at 90+2'  for Omonia against AEP (30 November 2008)

See also
 2008–09 Cypriot Cup
 2008–09 Cypriot Second Division
 List of Cypriot football transfers summer 2008

Sources

References

Cypriot First Division seasons
Cyprus
1